Cedar Vale is a rural locality in the City of Logan, Queensland, Australia. In the ,Cedar Vale had a population of 2,792 people.

Geography 
The Mount Lindesay Highway runs along the north-western boundary. Scrubby Creek forms the northern and eastern boundary of the locality.

History 
Formerly in the Shire of Beaudesert, Cedar Vale became part of Logan City following the local government amalgamations in March 2008.

In the 2011 census, Cedar Vale had a population of 2,971.

References

External links

 
 

Suburbs of Logan City
Localities in Queensland